Diwan Bahadur Lakshminarayanapuram Krishna Ananthakrishna Iyer (1861–1937) was an anthropologist of British India. He is known for his work among the hill tribes of the western part of Madras province.

Early life
Ananthakrishna Iyer was born to Vedic scholar L. N. Krishna Iyer, in the village of Lakshminarayanapuram near Palghat in the Madras Presidency which is in modern-day Kerala. He was the eldest of four sons and two daughters.

He matriculated from Palaghat high school in 1878 and passed BA from Madras Christian college in 1883.

Career
Ananthakrishna Iyer is best known for his books Castes and Tribes of Mysore, and Castes and Tribes of Cochin. Both are pioneering works on the tribes inhabiting India's west coast. He worked at the Revenue Department at Vayanad, then left to join Victoria College Palaghat.

In 1896, he became a headmaster in a Christian school. In 1897, he joined Maharajas College at Eranakulam as scientific assistant The log book kept at St Berchmans H S Changanacherry states, "He took charge of the school as Headmaster on 22 February 1897 ≥.He was there till May that year and left for Ernakulam by former Headmaster Thomas K J kallarakavumkal Mammood P O PIN 686536 Changanacherry Kerala".

His son, L. A. Krishna Iyer, was a noted anthropologist and a Padma Bhushan awardee.

Works 
The Mysore Tribes and Castes. Mysore: Mysore University Press.  (1930)
Tribes and Castes of Cochin. (1912)
The Anthropology of the Syrian Christians. (1926?)

References

Sources 
 
  Ajit K. Danda (ed.) (1989) L. K. Ananthakrishna Iyer: 125th Birth Anniversary Tribute. Special Volume of Human Science.

1861 births
Indian anthropologists
1937 deaths
People from West Godavari district
Dewan Bahadurs
Academic staff of Government Victoria College, Palakkad
Scholars from Andhra Pradesh
Indian social sciences writers
Writers from Andhra Pradesh
20th-century Indian social scientists
19th-century Indian social scientists